Liam Redmond (27 July 1913 – 28 October 1989) was an Irish character actor known for his stage, film and television roles.

Early life
Redmond was one of four children born to cabinet-maker Thomas and Eileen Redmond. Educated at the Christian Brothers schools in Dublin, he later attended University College, Dublin and initially read medicine before moving into drama.

Acting career
While Director of the Dramatic Society he met and married the society's secretary Barbara MacDonagh (sister of Donagh MacDonagh and daughter of 1916 Rising leader Thomas MacDonagh and Muriel Gifford). They had four children.

Redmond was invited to join the Abbey Theatre in 1935 as a producer by William Butler Yeats, the Irish poet. Yeats wrote his play Death of Cuchullain for Redmond to star as Cúchullain, hero of one of Ireland's foundational myths.

Redmond made his acting debut at the Abbey Theatre in 1935 in Seán O'Casey's The Silver Tassie. His first stage appearance was in 1939 in New York City in The White Steed. After returning to Britain at the outbreak of the Second World War he was a regular on the London stage. He was one of the founders of WAAMA, the Writers', Artists', Actors' and Musicians' Association, a precursor of Irish Actors' Equity. His insistence that "part-time professionals" – usually civil servants who acted on the side – should be paid a higher rate than professional actors for both rehearsal time and performance, effectively wiped out this class, raising the wages and fees of working actors.

He starred in Broadway, among other plays starring in Paul Vincent Carroll's 1939 The White Steed; in 1955 playing Canon McCooey in The Wayward Saint winning the George Jean Nathan Award for his performance, and in 1968 starring in Joe Orton's Loot and Brian Friel's The Loves of Cass Maguire.

Redmond worked in TV and film throughout the 1950s to the 1980s and was regularly seen in TV series such as The Avengers, Daniel Boone, The Saint and Z-Cars. He was often called upon as a character actor in various military, religious and judicial roles in films such as I See a Dark Stranger (1946), Captain Boycott (1947), High Treason (1951), The Cruel Sea (1953), Playboy of the Western World (1962), Kid Galahad (1962), The Luck of Ginger Coffey (1964), Tobruk (1967), The Ghost and Mr. Chicken (1966) and Barry Lyndon (1975). His performance as the kindly occult expert in the cult horror film Night of the Demon (1957) is a favourite of fans of the film.

Redmond retired to Dublin and died, aged 76, after a long period of ill health, in 1989. His wife Barbara predeceased him in 1987.

Selected filmography

 I See a Dark Stranger (1946) – Uncle Timothy
 Captain Boycott (1947) – Martin Egan
 Daughter of Darkness (1948) – Father Cocoran
 Saints and Sinners (1949) – O'Driscoll
 Sword in the Desert (1949) – Jerry McCarthy
 The Twenty Questions Murder Mystery (1950) – Echo News editor 
 High Treason (1951) – Cmdr. Robert Brennan
 The Gentle Gunman (1952) – Connolly
 The Cruel Sea (1953) – Watts
 Devil on Horseback (1954) – Scarlett O'Hara
 Happy Ever After (1954) – Regan
 Final Appointment (1954) – Inspector Corcoran
 The Passing Stranger (1954) – Barnes
 The Divided Heart (1954) – First Justice
 The Glass Cage (1955) – Inspector Lindley
 23 Paces to Baker Street (1956) – Joe
 Jacqueline (1956) – Mr. Lord
 Yield to the Night (1956) – Prison Doctor
 Safari (1956) – Roy Shaw
 The Long Haul (1957) – Casey
 Night of the Demon (1957) – Mark O'Brien
 Rooney (1958) – Mr. Doolan
 The Diplomatic Corpse (1958) – Inspector Corcoran
 She Didn't Say No! (1958) – 	Dr. Cassidy
 Ice-Cold in Alex (1958) – Brigadier (D.D.M.S.)
 No Trees in the Street (1959) – Bill
 Alive and Kicking (1959) – Old Man
 The Boy and the Bridge (1959) – Pat Doyle
 Scent of Mystery (1960) – Johnny Gin
 Under Ten Flags (1960) – Windsor
 The Valiant (1962) – Surgeon Commander Reilly
 The Phantom of the Opera (1962) – Police Insp. Ward (uncredited)
 Kid Galahad (1962) – Father Higgins
 Playboy of the Western World (1963) – Michael James
 The Luck of Ginger Coffey (1964) – MacGregor
 The Amorous Adventures of Moll Flanders (1965) – Convict Ship Captain
 The Ghost and Mr. Chicken (1966) – Kelsey
 Tobruk (1967) – Henry Portman
 The 25th Hour (1967) – Father Koruga
 The Adventures of Bullwhip Griffin (1967) – Capt. Swain
 The Last Safari (1967) – Alec Beaumont
 Till Death Us Do Part (1968) – Mike's Father
 David Copperfield (1970, TV Movie) – Mr. Quinion
 Barry Lyndon (1975) – Mr. Brady – Nora's Father
 Philadelphia, Here I Come (1975) – Senator Doogan (final film role)

References

External links
 
 
 

1913 births
1989 deaths
Abbey Theatre
Irish male stage actors
Irish male film actors
Irish male television actors
20th-century Irish male actors
Irish expatriate male actors in the United States